Gem State Airlines was a United States airline founded in 1978 in  It carried passengers for 11 months, from December 1978 to November 1979, and merged in January 1980 with Air Pacific to become Golden Gate Airlines.

Founded by Thomas D. "Tom" Soumas, Jr. (b. 1953) of Coeur d'Alene, its primary investor was Justin S. Colin  a New York financier.

Idaho's nickname is the Gem State, with origins back to its territorial years.

Cities served

Boise, Idaho
Coeur d'Alene, Idaho
Idaho Falls, Idaho
Lewiston, Idaho
Pocatello, Idaho
Pullman, Washington (& Moscow, Idaho)

Reno, Nevada
Salt Lake City, Utah
Seattle, Washington
Spokane, Washington
Sun Valley, Idaho
Twin Falls, Idaho

Source:

Fleet

Gem State operated the following turboprop aircraft: 

 6 Fairchild Swearingen Metroliner
 3 Convair 580

See also 
 List of defunct airlines of the United States

References

Defunct airlines of the United States
Defunct regional airlines of the United States
Airlines established in 1978
Airlines disestablished in 1980
1980 mergers and acquisitions
1978 establishments in Idaho
1980 disestablishments in Idaho
Transportation companies based in Idaho